Stará Lysá is a municipality and village in Nymburk District in the Central Bohemian Region of the Czech Republic. It has about 800 inhabitants.

Administrative parts
The village of Čihadla is an administrative part of Stará Lysá.

History
The first written mention of Stará Lysá is from 1013.

References

Villages in Nymburk District